Králický Sněžník or Śnieżnik is a mountain in Eastern Bohemia, located on the border between the Czech Republic and Poland. With , it is the highest mountain of the Snieznik Mountains.

Etymology
The name Sněžník or Śnieżnik derives from the word for "snow"; the mountain has snow cover for up to eight months a year. In Czech the adjective Králický (from the nearby town of Králíky) is added to distinguish it from the mountain called Děčínský Sněžník (near the town of Děčín). An alternative Polish name is Śnieżnik Kłodzki, from the town of Kłodzko. In German the mountain is known as Glatzer Schneeberg (from Glatz, the German name for Kłodzko),  Grulicher Schneeberg (from Gruhlich, the German name for Králíky), or Spieglitzer Schneeberg (from Spieglitz, which is now part of Staré Město).

Geography
The mountain is the highest peak of the Snieznik Mountains/Králický Sněžník (called Králický Sněžník in Czech). It lies between the town Králíky and the Kłodzko Gap that separates it from the Golden Mountains.

The massive was formed during the Tertiary. Sněžník lies on the water divide for the Black Sea (the Morava) and the Baltic Sea (the Nysa Kłodzka).

Between 1899 and 1973 a stone view-tower stood on the Silesian side of the mountain top. A statue of a young elephant was put in place of a former chalet.

On the Czech side a state protected Králický Sněžník National Nature Reserve was established in 1990. On the Polish side is the protected area of Śnieżnik Landscape Park.

The mountain and neighbouring areas are equipped for ski recreation.

Gallery

References

External links

 National Nature Reserve Králický Sněžník (in Czech)
 Photo gallery

Mountains and hills of the Czech Republic
Mountains of Poland
Landforms of Lower Silesian Voivodeship
Populated places in Ústí nad Orlicí District
Populated places in Šumperk District
Czech Republic–Poland border
International mountains of Europe
Mountain peaks of the Sudetes